Layton W. Freborg (born May 13, 1933) is an American politician in the state of North Dakota. He represented the 8th district in the North Dakota House of Representatives from 1973 to 1976 and 1979 to 1982, and the 8th district in the North Dakota State Senate from 1985 to 2012. He was the  Chairman of the State Senate Education Committee from 1995 to 2012. He also was Chairman of the North Dakota Republican Party from 1985 to 1991.

References

1933 births
Presidents pro tempore of the North Dakota Senate
Republican Party North Dakota state senators
Republican Party members of the North Dakota House of Representatives
Living people
2012 United States presidential electors